Asarva railway station is now one of the main railway station on Ahmedabad–Udaipur line in Ahmedabad district, Gujarat. Its code is ASV. It serves Asarwa area of Ahmedabad city. The station consists of 3 platforms.

Trains 

Some of the trains that runs from Asarva railway station are :

 19703/04 Asarva–Udaipur City Intercity Express
 79401/02 Asarva–Himmatnagar DEMU
 09543/44 Asarva–Dungarpur DEMU
 12981/82 Asarva-Jaipur SF Express
 10821/22 Asarva-Kota Express
 19329/30 Veer Bhumi Chittaurgarh Express(Asarva-Indore)

References

Ahmedabad railway division
Railway stations in Ahmedabad